Chahar Rustai (also Romanized as Chahār Rūstā’ī, Chahar Roosta’i,  and Chehār Rustai; also known as Chāh Rūstā’ī and Chehār Rustar) is a village in Rudhaleh Rural District of Rig District, Ganaveh County, Bushehr province, Iran. At the 2006 census, its population was 2,247 in 501 households. The following census in 2011 counted 2,505 people in 626 households. The latest census in 2016 showed a population of 2,365 people in 693 households; it was the largest village in its rural district.

References 

Populated places in Ganaveh County